West Germany (Federal Republic of Germany) competed at the 1984 Summer Olympics in Los Angeles, United States.  West Germany had joined the American-led boycott of the 1980 Summer Olympics four years previously. 390 competitors, 267 men and 123 women, took part in 194 events in 25 sports.

Medalists

Archery

All five of the German archers posted solid scores in the nation's third Olympic archery competition, with none placing lower than 15th.

Women's Individual Competition:
Manuela Dachner — 2508 points (→ 6th place)
Doris Haas — 2480 points (→ 11th place)

Men's Individual Competition:
Harry Wittig — 2497 points (→ 9th place)
Armin Garnreiter — 2494 points (→ 10th place)
Detlef Kahlert — 2486 points (1→ 5th place)

Athletics

Men's Competition
Men's 400 metres 
Erwin Skamrahl  
 Heat — 45.94
 Quarterfinals — 46.39 (→ did not advance)

Men's 5,000 metres
 Christoph Herle
 Heat — 13:46.35 
 Semifinals — did not finish (→ did not advance)

 Uwe Mönkemeyer
 Heat — 13:48.66
 Semifinals — did not finish (→ did not advance)

Men's 10,000 metres
 Christoph Herle
 Qualifying Heat — 28:30.28
 Final — 28:08.21 (→ 5th place)

Men's Marathon
 Ralf Salzmann
 Final — 2:15:29 (→ 18th place)

Men's High Jump
 Dietmar Mögenburg
 Qualification — 2.24 m
 Final — 2.35 m (→  Gold Medal)

 Carlo Thränhardt
 Qualification — 2.24 m
 Final — 2.15 m (→ 10th place)

 Gerd Nagel
 Qualification — 2.18 m (→ did not advance)

Men's Triple Jump
 Peter Bouschen
 Final — 16.77 m (→ 5th place)

Men's Javelin Throw 
 Wolfram Gambke 
 Qualification — 82.98 m 
 Final — 82.46 m (→ 4th place)

 Klaus Tafelmeier 
 Qualification — 73.52 m (→ did not advance, 22nd place)

Men's Shot Put
 Karsten Stolz 
 Qualifying Round — 18.98 m
 Final — 18.31 m (→ 12th place)

Men's Discus Throw
Rolf Danneberg
 Final — 66.60 m (→  Gold Medal)

Alwin Wagner
 Final — 64.72 m (→ 6th place)

Men's Hammer Throw 
 Karl-Hans Riehm 
 Qualification — 75.50 m 
 Final — 77.98 m (→  Silver Medal)

 Klaus Ploghaus 
 Qualification — 74.68m 
 Final — 76.68 m (→  Bronze Medal)

 Christoph Sahner 
 Qualification — 72.88 m
 Final — no mark (→ no ranking)

Men's Decathlon 
 Jürgen Hingsen 
 Final Result — 8673 points (→  Silver Medal)

 Siegfried Wentz 
 Final Result — 8412 points (→  Bronze Medal)

 Guido Kratschmer 
 Final Result — 8326 points (→ 4th place)

Men's 20 km Walk
 Dieter Hoffmann
 Final — did not start (→ no ranking)

Women's Competition
Women's 1,000 metres
 Moira Thurnden
 Heat — did not finish (→ no ranking)

Women's 1,500 metres 
 Roswitha Gerdes 
 Heat — 4:10.64
 Final — 4:04.41 (→ 4th place)

 Margrit Klinger 
 Heat — did not start (→ no ranking)

Women's 3,000 metres 
 Brigitte Kraus 
 Heat — 8:57.53
 Final — did not finish (→ no ranking)

Women's Marathon 
 Charlotte Teske 
 Final — 2:35:56 (→ 16th place)

Women's High Jump 
 Ulrike Meyfarth 
 Qualification — 1.90m 
 Final — 2.02m (→  Gold Medal)

 Heike Redetzky 
 Qualification — 1.90m 
 Final — 1.85m (→ 11th place)

 Brigitte Holzapfel 
 Qualification — 1.90m 
 Final — 1.85m (→ 11th place)

Women's Discus Throw 
 Ingra Manecke 
 Qualification — 56.20m
 Final — 58.56m (→ 6th place)

Women's Javelin Throw 
 Ingrid Thyssen 
 Qualification — 60.86m
 Final — 63.26m (→ 6th place)

 Beate Peters 
 Qualification — 61.56m
 Final — 62.34m (→ 7th place)

Women's Shot Put
 Claudia Losch
 Final — 20.48 m (→  Gold Medal)

Women's Heptathlon
 Sabine Everts
 Final Result — 6363 points (→  Bronze Medal)

 Sabine Braun
 Final Result — 6236 points (→ 6th place)

 Birgit Dressel
 Final Result — 6082 points (→ 9th place)

Basketball

Men's Team Competition
Preliminary Round (Group A)
Lost to Yugoslavia (83-96)
Lost to Italy (72-80)
Lost to Australia (66-66)
Defeated Egypt (85-58)
Defeated Brazil (78-75)
Quarterfinals
Lost to United States (67-78)
Classification Matches
5th/8th place: Lost to Italy (71-98)
7th/8th place: Lost to Australia (76-83) → 8th place

Team Roster
Christoph Komer 
Vladimir Kadlec
Uwe Brauer
Uwe Sauer
Ulrich Peters 
Klaus Zander
Michael Pappert 
Armin Sowa
Detlef Schrempf 
Uwe Blab
Ingo Mendel
Christian Welp

Boxing

Men's Bantamweight (– 54 kg)
Stefan Gertel
 First Round — Bye
 Second Round — Lost to Louis Gomis (France), retired in the second round

Men's Lightweight (– 60 kg)
Reiner Gies
 First Round — Bye
 Second Round — Defeated Samir Khenyab (Iraq), 4:1
 Third Round — Defeated John Kalbhenn (Canada), 5:0
 Quarterfinals — Lost to Pernell Whitaker (United States),  0:5

Men's Light Welterweight (– 63.5 kg)
Helmut Gertel
 First Round — Bye
 Second Round — Lost to Jerry Page (United States), 0:5

Men's Welterweight (– 67 kg)
Alexander Künzler
 First Round — Bye
 Second Round — Defeated Mohamed Ali Aldahan (Syria), 5:0
 Third Round — Defeated Kamel Abboud (Algeria), 4:1
 Quarterfinals — Lost to Luciano Bruno (Italy), 0:5

Men's Light Middleweight (– 71 kg)
Manfred Zielonka → Bronze Medal
 First Round — Bye
 Second Round — Defeated Ambrose Mlilo (Zimbabwe), 4:1
 Third Round — Defeated Gustavo Ollo (Argentina), 5:0
 Quarterfinals — Defeated Gnohery Sery (Ivory Coast), 5:0
 Semifinals — Lost to Frank Tate (United States), walkover
 
Men's Middleweight (– 75 kg)
Andreas Bauer
 First Round — Lost to Antonio Corti (Argentina), 0:5

Men's Light Heavyweight (– 81 kg)
Markus Bott
 First Round — Bye
 Second Round — Lost to Anton Josipović (Yugoslavia), 1:4

Men's Super Heavyweight (+ 91 kg)
Peter Hussing
 First Round — Defeated Olaf Mayer (Austria), 5:0
 Quarterfinals — Lost to Aziz Salihu (Yugoslavia), 2:3

Canoeing

Cycling

Twenty cyclists, sixteen men and four women, represented West Germany in 1984.

Men's individual road race
 Thomas Freienstein
 Achim Stadler
 Werner Stauff
 Andreas Kappes

Team time trial
 Hartmut Bölts
 Thomas Freienstein
 Bernd Gröne
 Michael Maue

Sprint
 Gerhard Scheller
 Fredy Schmidtke

1000m time trial
 Fredy Schmidtke

Individual pursuit
 Rolf Gölz
 Ingo Wittenborn

Team pursuit
 Reinhard Alber
 Rolf Gölz
 Roland Günther
 Michael Marx

Points race
Uwe Messerschmidt
 Final — 16 points (→  Silver Medal)
Manfred Donike
 Final — 3 points (→ 19th place)

Women's individual road race
 Sandra Schumacher — 2:11:14 (→  Bronze Medal)
 Ute Enzenauer — 2:13:28 (→ 8th place)
 Ines Varenkamp — 2:13:28 (→ 12th place)
 Gabriele Altweck

Diving

Men's 3m Springboard
Albin Killat
 Preliminary Round — 549.39
 Final — 569.52 (→ 7th place)

Dieter Dörr
 Preliminary Round — 533.61
 Final — 549.33 (→ 10th place)

Equestrianism

Fencing

20 fencers, 15 men and 5 women, represented West Germany in 1984.

Men's foil
 Matthias Behr
 Matthias Gey
 Harald Hein

Men's team foil
 Harald Hein, Matthias Behr, Matthias Gey, Klaus Reichert, Frank Beck

Men's épée
 Elmar Borrmann
 Alexander Pusch
 Volker Fischer

Men's team épée
 Elmar Borrmann, Volker Fischer, Gerhard Heer, Rafael Nickel, Alexander Pusch

Men's sabre
 Freddy Scholz
 Jürgen Nolte
 Jörg Stratmann

Men's team sabre
 Dieter Schneider, Jürgen Nolte, Freddy Scholz, Jörg Stratmann, Jörg Volkmann

Women's foil
 Cornelia Hanisch
 Sabine Bischoff
 Christiane Weber

Women's team foil
 Christiane Weber, Cornelia Hanisch, Sabine Bischoff, Ute Kircheis-Wessel, Zita-Eva Funkenhauser

Football

Men's Team Competition
 Preliminary Round (Group C)
 West Germany – Morocco 2 – 0
 West Germany – Brazil 0 – 1
 West Germany – Saudi Arabia 4 – 0
 Quarter Finals
 West Germany – Yugoslavia 2 – 5

Team Roster:
 ( 1.) Bernd Franke
 ( 2.) Manfred Bockenfeld
 ( 3.) Roland Dickgiesser
 ( 4.) Dieter Bast
 ( 5.) Bernd Wehmeyer
 ( 6.) Guido Buchwald 
 ( 7.) Jürgen Groh
 ( 8.) Rudolf Bommer 
 ( 9.) Dieter Schatzschneider
 (10.) Andreas Brehme 
 (11.) Frank Mill
 (12.) Walter Junghans
 (13.) Alfred Schoen
 (14.) Peter Lux
 (15.) Uwe Rahn
 (16.) Christian Schreier
 (17.) Dieter Schlindwein

Gymnastics

Handball

Men's Team Competition
Team Roster
Jochen Fraatz
Thomas Happe
Arnulf Meffle
Rüdiger Neitzel
Michael Paul
Dirk Rauin
Siegfried Roch
Michael Roth
Ulrich Roth
Martin Schwalb
Uwe Schwenker
Thomas Springel
Andreas Thiel
Klaus Wöller
Erhard Wunderlich

Women's Team Competition
Team Roster
Maike Becker
Elke Blumauer
Sabine Erbs
Astrid Huhn
Kerstin Jonsson
Sabrina Koschella
Corinna Kunze
Roswitha Mroczynski
Petra Platen
Vanadis Putzke
Silvia Schmitt
Dagmar Stelberg
Claudia Sturm

Hockey

Men's Team Competition
Preliminary Round (Group A)
 Defeated Spain (3-1)
 Defeated United States (4-0) 
 Lost to Australia (0-3)
 Defeated Malaysia (5-0)
 Drew with India (0-0)
Semi Finals
 Defeated Great Britain (1-0) 
Final
 Lost to Pakistan (1-2) after extra time  →  Silver Medal

Team Roster
 Tobias Frank (gk)
 Christian Bassemir (gk)
 Michael Peter
 Horst-Ulrich Hänel
 Carsten Fischer
 Markku Slawyk
 Thomas Gunst
 Volker Fried
 Eckhard Schmidt-Opper
 Joachim Hürter
 Andreas Keller
 Dirk Brinkmann
 Stefan Blöcher
 Thomas Reck
 Heiner Dopp
 Reinhard Krull

Women's Team Competition
Round Robin
 Drew with Australia (2-2)
 Defeated Canada (3-0)
 Lost to The Netherlands (2-6)
 Defeated New Zealand (1-0)
 Drew with United States (1-1) →  Silver Medal

Team Roster
 Susanne Schmid (gk)
 Ursula Thielemann (gk)
 Christina Moser
 Hella Roth
 Dagmar Breiken
 Sigrid Landgraf
 Elke Drüll
 Corinna Lingnau
 Andrea Weiermann-Lietz
 Gaby Appel
 Birgit Hagen
 Birgit Hahn
 Beate Deininger
 Patricia Ott
 Martina Koch
 Gabi Schley

Judo

Modern pentathlon

Three male modern pentathletes represented West Germany in 1984.

Individual
 Achim Bellmann
 Michael Rehbein
 Christian Sandow

Team
 Achim Bellmann
 Michael Rehbein
 Christian Sandow

Rhythmic gymnastics

Rowing

Sailing

Shooting

Swimming

Men's Competition
Men's 100m Freestyle 
Dirk Korthals
 Heat — 51.02
 Final — 50.93 (→ 8th place)

Alexander Schowtka
 Heat — 51.78 (→ did not advance, 20th place)

Men's 200m Freestyle
Michael Groß
 Heat — 1:48.03
 Final — 1:47.44 (→  Gold Medal)

Thomas Fahrner
 Heat — 1:50.00
 Final — 1:49.69 (→  Bronze Medal)

Men's 400m Freestyle 
Stefan Pfeiffer
 Heat — 3:53.41 
 Final — 3:52.91 (→ 4th place)

Thomas Fahrner
 Heat — 3:55.26 
 B-Final — 3:50.91 (→ 9th place)

Men's 1500m Freestyle 
Stefan Pfeiffer
 Heat — 15:21.95
 Final — 15:12.77 (→  Bronze Medal)

Rainer Henkel
 Heat — 15:23.60 
 Final — 15:20.03 (→ 4th place)

Men's 100m Backstroke 
Stefan Peter
 Heat — 57.90
 B-Final — 58.30 (→ 11th place)

Nicolai Klapkarek
 Heat — 58.19 
 B-Final — 58.56 (→ 15th place)

Men's 200m Backstroke 
Nicolai Klapkarek
 Heat — 2:04.45 
 Final — 2:03.95 (→ 6th place)

Stefan Peter
 Heat — 2:05.22
 B-Final — 2:05.66 (→ 13th place)

Men's 100m Breaststroke
Gerald Mörken
 Heat — 1:03.53
 Final — 1:03.95 (→ 7th place)

Peter Lang
 Heat — 1:04.40
 B-Final — 1:04.43 (→ 11th place)

Men's 200m Breaststroke
Gerald Mörken
 Heat — 2:22.99 (→ did not advance, 18th place)

Peter Lang
 Heat — 2:24.60 (→ did not advance, 22nd place)

Men's 100m Butterfly
Michael Groß
 Heat — 54.02
 Final — 53.08 (→  Gold Medal)

Andreas Behrend
 Heat — 55.22
 Final — 54.95 (→ 7th place)

Men's 200m Butterfly
Michael Groß
 Heat — 1:58.72
 Final — 1:57.40 (→  Silver Medal)

Andreas Behrend
 Heat — 2:06.06 (→ did not advance, 24th place)

Men's 200m Individual Medley
Nicolai Klapkarek
 Heat — 2:06.07
 Final — 2:05.88 (→ 7th place)

Ralf Diegel
 Heat — 2:06.41
 Final — 2:06.66 (→ 8th place)

Men's 400m Individual Medley
Ralf Diegel
 Heat — 4:28.10
 B-Final — 4:28.94 (→ 12th place)

Men's 4 × 100 m Freestyle Relay 
Dirk Korthals, Alexander Schowtka, Nicolai Klapkarek, and Andreas Schmidt
 Heat — 3:24.69
Dirk Korthals, Andreas Schmidt, Alexander Schowtka, and Michael Groß
 Final — 3:22.98 (→ 4th place)

Men's 4 × 200 m Freestyle Relay 
Rainer Henkel, Dirk Korthals, Alexander Schowtka, and Thomas Fahrner
 Heat — 7:25.29
Thomas Fahrner, Dirk Korthals, Alexander Schowtka, and Michael Groß
 Final — 7:15.73 (→  Silver Medal)

Men's 4 × 100 m Medley Relay 
Stefan Peter, Gerald Mörken, Andreas Behrend, and Alexander Schowtka
 Heat — 3:49.75
Stefan Peter, Gerald Mörken, Michael Groß, and Dirk Korthals
 Final — 3:44.26 (→ 4th place)

Women's Competition
Women's 100m Freestyle 
Susanne Schuster
 Heat — 56.85 
 Final — 56.90 (→ 6th place)

Iris Zscherpe
 Heat — 57.31
 B-Final — 57.19 (→ 9th place)

Women's 200m Freestyle 
Ina Beyermann
 Heat — 2:02.42
 Final — 2:01.89 (→ 7th place)

Iris Zscherpe
 Heat — 2:03.95
 B-Final — 2:03.42 (→ 10th place)

Women's 400m Freestyle 
Birgit Kowalczik
 Heat — 4:17.92
 Final — 4:16.33 (→ 7th place)

Ina Beyermann
 Heat — 4:18.94
 B-Final — scratched (→ 17th place)

Women's 800m Freestyle 
Birgit Kowalczik
 Heat — 8:53.34 (→ did not advance, 11th place)

Women's 4 × 100 m Freestyle Relay 
Iris Zscherpe, Susanne Schuster, Christiane Pielke, and Karin Seick
 Heat — 3:46.49 
 Final — 3:45.56 (→  Bronze Medal)

Women's 4 × 100 m Medley Relay
Svenja Schlicht, Ute Hasse, Ina Beyermann, and Karin Seick
 Heat — 4:13.58
 Final — 4:11.97 (→  Silver Medal)

Women's 100m Backstroke
Svenja Schlicht
 Heat — 1:04.02
 Final — 1:03.46 (→ 6th place)

Sandra Dahlmann
 Heat — 1:05.27 (→ did not advance, 17th place)

Women's 200m Backstroke
Svenja Schlicht
 Heat — 2:15.69
 Final — 2:15.93 (→ 6th place)

Sandra Dahlmann
 Heat — 2:19.59
 B-Final — 2:16.93 (→ 9th place)

Women's 200m Butterfly
Ina Beyermann
 Heat — 2:13.26
 Final — 2:11.91 (→  Bronze Medal)

Petra Zindler
 Heat — 2:15.20
 B-Final — 2:16.50 (→ 14th place)

Women's 200m Individual Medley
Christiane Pielke
 Heat — 2:19.17
 Final — 2:17.82 (→ 5th place)

Petra Zindler
 Heat — 2:20.05
 Final — 2:19.86 (→ 7th place)

Women's 400m Individual Medley
Petra Zindler
 Heat — 4:52.49
 Final — 4:48.57 (→  Bronze Medal)

Synchronized swimming

Volleyball

Women's Team Competition
Preliminary Round (Group B)
 Lost to United States (0-3)
 Lost to China (0-3)
 Defeated Brazil (3-0)
Classification Matches
 5th/8th place: Defeated Canada (3-0)
 5th/6th place: Lost to South Korea (0-3) → Sixth place

Team Roster
 Ruth Holzhausen
 Birgitta Rühmer
 Gudrun Witte
 Beate Bühler
 Regina Vossen
 Sigrid Terstegge
 Andrea Sauvigny
 Renate Riek
 Marina Staden
 Almut Kemperdick
 Terry Place-Brandel
 Ute Hankers

Water polo

Men's Team Competition
Preliminary Round (Group C)
 Defeated Australia (10-6)
 Defeated Japan (15-8)
 Defeated Italy (10-4)
Final Round (Group D)
 Drew with Spain (8-8)
 Lost to Yugoslavia (9-10)
 Lost to United States (7-8)
 Defeated Netherlands (15-2) →  Bronze Medal

Team Roster
 Peter Röhle
 Thomas Loebb
 Frank Otto
 Rainer Hoppe
 Armando Fernández
 Thomas Huber
 Jürgen Schroder
 Rainer Osselmann
 Hagen Stamm
 Roland Freund
 Dirk Theismann
 Werner Obschernikat

Weightlifting

Wrestling

References

Germany, West
1984
Summer Olympics